Eugene McManus (born 20 July 1962) is an Irish judoka. He competed in the men's lightweight event at the 1988 Summer Olympics.

References

1962 births
Living people
Irish male judoka
Olympic judoka of Ireland
Judoka at the 1988 Summer Olympics
Place of birth missing (living people)